The Golden Ball is a public house and hotel on Ball Street in the English market town of Poulton-le-Fylde, Lancashire. Built in the 19th century, it was originally a coaching inn for travellers making their way to local towns and villages. As of 2023, the three-storey building is owned by Greene King. It was formerly a Tetley's establishment.

In 1847, the building's billiard room hosted the first county court session in the town.

During the course of its existence, the building has been a police courtroom, a newsroom and a café.

Beginning in 1897, an auction mart occupied the land behind the building, formerly the pub's gardens, until it was replaced by today's car park. It featured a bull ring and a calf ring. Some of the walls of the auction mart are still standing, with the rings for the tethering of bulls still attached. The Auction Market Company folded in 1964, and some of its buildings became shops — including Gleeson's Joiners, The Victorian Birdcage, The Paper Tree and a charity shop. These were demolished in 2006.

Tom Lockwood, landlord of the pub in the 19th century, formed Catterall & Swarbrick Brewery Ltd. in 1880 with fellow locals William Catterall and John Swarbrick.

The pub is one of 32 buildings in the town's Conservation Area.

Ball Street is named for the pub.

Interior

References

External links 

Buildings and structures in Poulton-le-Fylde
18th-century establishments in England
Pubs in Lancashire
Hotels in Lancashire
Coaching inns